Global Underground 025: Deep Dish, Toronto is a DJ mix album in the Global Underground series, compiled and mixed by Deep Dish. The compilation reached the Billboard #1 Top Electronic Albums, #20 Independent Albums, and #29 Top Heatseekers. The release also has two Afterhours mixes, each mixed by Sharam and Dubfire individually.

The eagerly anticipated second mix from Deep Dish carried on where they left off with Global Underground 021: Moscow in terms of the stunning marriage of soulful vocals with twisted house music.

A limited run 4 x CD pack featured afterhours mixes by Dubfire and Sharam separately, a move that hinted towards their eventual pursuit of solo appearances.

Track listing

Disc one
Louie Vega & Jay 'Sinister' Sealée - Diamond Life/Stephane K - Numb (Meat Katie Remix) – 7:56
Sultan - Nightvisions – 6:46
5th Order - Sineweaver – 5:00
Electroland - Drop Beat (Circulation Mix) – 6:22
Sultan & The Greek - Rezin/Samio - Into Black (Acapella) – 6:43
Cheky & DJ Spider - In Love (Killer Mix) – 5:57
Electric Mood - Sacred Dance – 4:41
Aalacho - Satellite (Evolved Mix) – 5:44
Valentino - Flying (Sultan & The Greek Remix) – 7:49
Moony - Doves (I'll Be Loving You) (John Creamer & Stephane K Remix) – 7:20
Accorsi & Bassetti - Until the End – 4:46
Seroya - Only Your Love (Holmes Ives Remix) – 7:22

Disc two
Situation 2wo - Way2tite  – 7:01
Elisa - Time (Planet Funk Mix)  – 7:29
Junkie XL & Sasha - Breezer  – 6:15
Sander Kleinenberg & Miss Bunty - Work to Do  – 7:14
Paul Rogers - Krafty  – 6:30
Paul Rogers - Krafty (G-Pal's Sea Paradise Mix)  – 6:15
Lowriders - Part 1  – 4:34
Miro - The One I Run To  – 5:15
Phil Kieran - I Love You  – 4:45
Knight Keys - Never Felt This Way (Behrouz & Andy Caldwell Remix)  – 6:54
Maurice & Noble - Hoochikoochi (I'm Ready Mix)  – 4:00
The Youngsters - Break Them Up  – 5:37
Holden & Thompson - Nothing (93 Returning Mix)  – 5:35

References

External links 

Deep Dish (band) compilation albums
Global Underground
2003 compilation albums
DJ mix albums